Vityazevo is a rural locality (a selo) in Vityazevsky Rural Okrug under the administrative jurisdiction of the Town of Anapa in Krasnodar Krai, Russia, located  north of Anapa proper on a bank of the Vityazevsky liman. Population:

History
The stanitsa of Vityazevskaya, named after Major Vityaz, existed in this location from 1837 to 1862. In 1862, it became the settlement of Vityazevskoye.

Vityazevo had urban-type settlement status until January 1, 2005.

Sights and recreation

The "Paralia" embankment, built in ancient Greek style, is the main attraction in Vityazevo.

Vityazevo is also known for its peloids.

Vityazevo is surrounded by vineyards and has a winery.

References

Rural localities in Krasnodar Krai